Fusicoccum ramosum is an endophytic fungus that might be a canker pathogen, specifically for Adansonia gibbosa (baobab). It was isolated from said trees, as well as surrounding ones, in the Kimberley (Western Australia).

References

Further reading
Sakalidis, Monique L., Giles E. StJ Hardy, and Treena I. Burgess. "Endophytes as potential pathogens of the baobab species Adansonia gregorii: a focus on the Botryosphaeriaceae." Fungal Ecology 4.1 (2011): 1–14.
Slippers, B., et al. "A diverse assemblage of Botryosphaeriaceae infect Eucalyptus in native and non-native environments." Southern Forests: a Journal of Forest Science 71.2 (2009): 101–110.
Abdollahzadeh, Jafar, Rasoul Zare, and Alan JL Phillips. "Phylogeny and taxonomy of Botryosphaeria and Neofusicoccum species in Iran, with description of Botryosphaeria scharifii sp. Nov." Mycologia 105.1 (2013): 210–220.

External links 
MycoBank

Botryosphaeriales
Fungi described in 2008